In physics, a free particle is a particle that, in some sense, is not bound by an external force, or equivalently not in a region where its potential energy varies. In classical physics, this means the particle is present in a "field-free" space. In quantum mechanics, it means the particle is in a region of uniform potential, usually set to zero in the region of interest since the potential can be arbitrarily set to zero at any point in space.

Classical free particle

The classical free particle is characterized by a fixed velocity v. The momentum is given by

and the kinetic energy (equal to total energy) by

where m is the mass of the particle and v is the vector velocity of the particle.

Quantum free particle

Mathematical description

A free particle with mass  in non-relativistic quantum mechanics is described by the free Schrödinger equation:

where ψ is the wavefunction of the particle at position r and time t. The solution for a particle with momentum p or wave vector k, at angular frequency ω or energy E, is given by the complex plane wave:

with amplitude A and restricted to: 
 if the particle has mass :  (or equivalent ). 
 if the particle is a massless particle: .

The De Broglie relations: ,  apply. Since the potential energy is (stated to be) zero, the total energy E is equal to the kinetic energy, which has the same form as in classical physics: 

As for all quantum particles free or bound, the Heisenberg uncertainty principles  apply. It is clear that since the plane wave has definite momentum (definite energy), the probability of finding the particle's location is uniform and negligible all over the space. In other words, the wave function is not normalizable in a Euclidean space, these stationary states can not correspond to physical realizable states.

Measurement and calculations

The integral of the probability density function

where * denotes complex conjugate, over all space is the probability of finding the particle in all space, which must be unity if the particle exists:

This is the normalization condition for the wave function. The wavefunction is not normalizable for a plane wave, but is for a wavepacket.

Fourier decomposition
The free particle wave function may be represented by a superposition of momentum eigenfunctions, with coefficients given by the Fourier transform of the initial wavefunction:

The expectation value of the momentum p for the complex plane wave is

and for the general wave packet it is

The expectation value of the energy E is

Group velocity and phase velocity

The phase velocity is defined to be the speed at which a plane wave solution propagates, namely

Note that  is not the speed of a classical particle with momentum ; rather, it is half of the classical velocity.

Meanwhile, suppose that the initial wave function  is a wave packet whose Fourier transform  is concentrated near a particular wave vector . Then the group velocity of the plane wave is defined as

which agrees with the formula for the classical velocity of the particle. The group velocity is the (approximate) speed at which the whole wave packet propagates, while the phase velocity is the speed at which the individual peaks in the wave packet move. The figure illustrates this phenomenon, with the individual peaks within the wave packet propagating at half the speed of the overall packet.

Spread of the wave packet
In this approximation, the amplitude of the wave packet moves at a velocity equal to the group velocity without changing shape. This result is an approximation that fails to capture certain interesting aspects of the evolution a free quantum particle. Notably, the width of the wave packet, as measured by the uncertainty in the position, grows linearly in time for large times. This phenomenon is called the spread of the wave packet for a free particle.

Specifically, it is not difficult to compute an exact formula for the uncertainty  as a function of time, where  is the position operator. Working in one spatial dimension for simplicity, we have:

where  is the time-zero wave function.

If the momentum of the initial wave function  is highly localized, the wave packet will spread slowly and the group-velocity approximation will remain good for a long time. Intuitively, this result says that if the initial wave function has a very sharply defined momentum, then the particle has a sharply defined velocity and will (to good approximation) propagate at this velocity for a long time.

Relativistic quantum free particle

There are a number of equations describing relativistic particles: see relativistic wave equations.

See also

 Wave packet
 Group velocity
 Particle in a box
 Finite square well
 Delta potential

References

 Quantum Mechanics, E. Abers, Pearson Ed., Addison Wesley, Prentice Hall Inc, 2004, 
 Quantum Physics of Atoms, Molecules, Solids, Nuclei, and Particles (2nd Edition), R. Eisberg, R. Resnick, John Wiley & Sons, 1985, 
 Stationary States, A. Holden, College Physics Monographs (USA), Oxford University Press, 1971, 

 Quantum Mechanics Demystified, D. McMahon, Mc Graw Hill (USA), 2006, 
 Elementary Quantum Mechanics, N.F. Mott, Wykeham Science, Wykeham Press (Taylor & Francis Group), 1972, 
 Quantum mechanics, E. Zaarur, Y. Peleg, R. Pnini, Schaum's Outlines, Mc Graw Hill (USA), 1998, 

Specific

Further reading

 The New Quantum Universe, T.Hey, P.Walters, Cambridge University Press, 2009, .
 Quantum Field Theory, D. McMahon, Mc Graw Hill (USA), 2008, 
 Quantum mechanics, E. Zaarur, Y. Peleg, R. Pnini, Schaum's Easy Outlines Crash Course, Mc Graw Hill (USA), 2006, 

Concepts in physics
Classical mechanics
Quantum models